Bentosites macleayi is a species of air-breathing land snails, terrestrial pulmonate gastropod mollusc in the family Camaenidae. 

This species is endemic to Australia.

References

 Stanisic, J. 1996.  Sphaerospira macleayi.

External links
  Cox, J. C. (1865). Descriptions of two new species of Australian land shells. Proceedings of the Zoological Society of London. 1864: 486
  Iredale, T. (1933). Systematic notes on Australian land shells. Records of the Australian Museum. 19(1): 37-59
 ABRS. (2009). Australian Faunal Directory (AFD). Australian Biological Resources Study, Canberra
 2006 IUCN Red List of Threatened Species.   Downloaded on 7 August 2007.

Gastropods of Australia
macleayi
Gastropods described in 1865